Jette Louisa Fleschütz (born 23 October 2002) is a German field hockey player, who plays as a forward.

She will represent Germany at the Games of the XXXII Olympiad.

Career

Under–18
Jette Fleschütz made her debut for the German U–18 team in 2019. Throughout the year she made 15 appearances and scored 4 goals.

Die Danas
In 2021, Fleschütz broke into the Die Danas squad for the first time. She made her first appearance for the national team during an FIH Pro League match against the Netherlands in Amsterdam. On May 27, national coach Xavier Reckinger named the Die Danas squad for the Summer Olympics in Tokyo. Fleschütz will make her Olympic debut at the games, being a surprise addition to the squad.

References

External links

2002 births
Living people
German female field hockey players
Female field hockey forwards
Field hockey players from Hamburg
Field hockey players at the 2020 Summer Olympics
Olympic field hockey players of Germany
21st-century German women